Joshua Jon Pyke (born 18 December 1977) is an Australian singer-songwriter, producer, musician and children's book author.

Biography
Josh Pyke is a prolific songwriter, with a successful and critically acclaimed career both domestically and overseas. Josh's 6 studio albums to date have all debuted in the ARIA Top 10. Amongst numerous other honours, he has received 4 ARIA Awards, 10 ARIA nominations, and gold/ platinum accreditations. Josh is a member of the AGSC, and a respected composer for Film/TV– having received an APRA Award for film composition, Josh has also worked on a slew of recent TV / advertising projects, including popular ABC series The Justine Clarke Show, Miki Vs The World (Season 1&2) and the upcoming dark drama Troppo.

Through his work with the Indigenous Literacy Foundation, Josh has also run numerous song-writing workshops with Indigenous communities, and raised over $50,000 for the organisation through his Busking For Change events.

Josh is a committed member of the music community, and an influential advocate for creators. Josh has been an active APRA Ambassador for 15 years, and has also served as PPCA Board Director (Artist Representative) since 2016. He has represented musicians in national forums such as Parliament House roundtables, Q+A, and The Project, on key issues including copyright reform, Arts funding, and more recently, the impact of COVID-19 on the creative industries. Josh also champions emerging musicians via the JP Partnership, a mentorship program he established with APRA/AMCOS in 2014.

Josh Pyke is also an acclaimed children's book author, with 4 titles out, (Lights Out Leonard, A Banana is A Banana, The Incredible Runaway Snot, Chatterpuss,) and 3 more titles to be released in 21/22, (Chatterpuss In Deep Water, A Family Tree, The Bewilderbeast).

Pyke released his 7th studio album To Find Happiness on 18 March 2022.

2003–2004: Early EPs and Night Hour
Josh Pyke was in his first band by age 12 and played his first performance in front of 650 parents and students at his primary school graduation. Playing guitar and initial song writing efforts came aged 14. Despite his aptitude for song writing and performance, he stayed 'under the radar' throughout his high school years at Fort Street High School.

While part of Sydney band An Empty Flight he successfully applied for a grant from the Music Board of the Australia Council under the Buzz Project to remix a number of his own demo recordings to be released as an EP Current Works Volume 1, under the name of Night Hour. The lead track, "Kids Don't Sell Their Hopes So Fast", received wide-ranging radio airplay on national youth broadcaster triple j and on various community radio stations including 3RRR in Melbourne and Fbi in Sydney. In 2004 Pyke won the Jaxter Music Award for his single "Kids Don't Sell Their Hopes So Fast". The proceeds went towards a home studio. A second EP titled The Doldrums was released in November 2004.

2005–2006: Early EPs as Josh Pyke
In 2005, Pyke signed to Australian indie label Ivy League Records and in September 2005 released the EP Feeding the Wolves, the first under his name Josh Pyke. It features the singles "Middle of the Hill" and "Private Education" and peaked at number 64 on the ARIA Charts. In January 2006, "Middle of the Hill" was voted at number 19 in the Triple J Hottest 100, 2005.

In 2006, Pyke spent a month in New York, writing and performing before touring the UK for the first time in support of Feeding the Wolves. In October 2006, the song "Memories & Dust" was released which peaked at number 39 on the ARIA Charts.

2007–2009: Memories & Dust & Chimney's Afire

Josh Pyke released his debut studio album, Memories & Dust on 10 March 2007. It debuted at number 4 on ARIA Charts. Lead singles "Memories & Dust" and "Lines on Palms" peaked within the ARIA top 50. At the ARIA Music Awards of 2007, the album was nominated for five awards, winning three.

Pyke recorded a cover version of "Wuthering Heights" by Kate Bush for the No Man's Woman album which was released in 2007.

In 2008, Pyke and Michael Yezerski won the APRA award for Best Original Song Composed for the Screen for "When We Get There", from the film The Black Balloon.

In October 2008, Pyke's second studio album Chimney's Afire was released. It debuted at number 3 on the ARIA charts, and number 1 on the ARIA Australian Album Chart.

In August 2009, he played a series of concerts where The Beatles' White Album was played from start to finish with Tim Rogers, Chris Cheney and Phil Jamieson. The tour was extended due to popular demand.

At the ARIA Music Awards of 2009, Chimney's Afire was nominated for two awards, winning Best Adult Contemporary Album.

2010: Basement Birds

In mid-2009, Pyke form the Australian indie pop rock group, Basement Birds with Kevin Mitchell (of Jebediah, aka Bob Evans), Steve Parkin (ex-Vinyl, Autopilot, solo) and Kavyen Temperley (of Eskimo Joe). The group released a self-titled studio album in July 2010, which peaked at number 12 on the ARIA charts.

2011–2012: Only Sparrows
In January 2011 Pyke spent a month in New York to finish writing the album that was to become Only Sparrows. On return he recorded the album with ARIA Award-winning producer Wayne Connolly and it was released 19 August 2011. The album debuted at number 4 on the ARIA Charts.

In October 2011, Pyke toured the UK, this time on a co-headline tour with friend and occasional collaborator Mike Rosenberg AKA Passenger. While touring, the pair collaborated on new material, which resulted in Passenger having writing credits on "Leeward Side" and Josh having writing credits on "27". At the ARIA Music Awards of 2011, Only Sparrows was nominated for three awards.

Pyke concluded 2011 playing at the 2011/2012 Falls Festivals in Victoria and Tasmania before heading to Southbound Festival in Western Australia. In February 2012 he performed "Love Lies" and a cover of The Jezabels' "Endless Summer" featuring Elana Stone on triple j's Like a Version. The song was included on the Like a Version Volume 8.

In 2012, Pyke joined a cast of Australian musicians to launch a campaign to support peers who have hit hard times. The campaign was called Support Act for which Pyke became an ambassador, featuring in the TV commercial—"Not everyone in the music industry is able to lead a comfortable life when the music stops playing".

2013–2014: The Beginning and the End of Everything
On 6 July 2013, Pyke released his fourth studio album, The Beginning and the End of Everything, which debuted at number 7 on the ARIA Chart. The release was followed by a sold out national tour. At the ARIA Music Awards of 2013, the album was nominated for Best Adult Contemporary Album.

Pyke spent much of 2014 travelling Australia for his three Lone Wolf tours (Lone Wolf Tour, Lone Wolf Regional Tour and Last of the Lone Wolf Tour).

In July 2014, Pyke joined Phil Jamieson (Grinspoon), Chris Cheney (The Living End) and Tim Rogers (You Am I) for the second time to tour Australia on The White Album Concert tour. Both the 2009 and 2014 tours were completely sold out and extended due to popular demand.

2015–2016: But for All These Shrinking Hearts and Live at the Sydney Opera House
In April 2015, Pyke collaborated with the Sydney Symphony Orchestra for two specially curated shows at the iconic Sydney Opera House. Pyke spent three months working with ten up-and-coming composers redesigning his songs for the shows. Following the success of these performances, Pyke brought the show to the Perth Concert Hall and performed it with the West Australian Symphony Orchestra in July 2015.

On 31 July 2015 Josh Pyke released his fifth studio album, But for All These Shrinking Hearts, which debuted at number 2 on the ARIA charts. It was his first release on new label Wonderlick Entertainment, distributed by Sony. In conjunction with the release, Pyke played four sold out intimate Fans First shows around Australia. He then sold-out shows at Melbourne Zoo and Taronga Zoo in Sydney on his capital city tour. Pyke appeared the 2015 Woodword Folk Festival and the Falls Music & Arts Festival.

Pyke's performance at the Sydney Opera House in 2015, was released in July 2016 and peaked at number 27. At the ARIA Music Awards of 2016, the album won the ARIA Award for Best Original Soundtrack, Cast or Show Album.

2017–2020: The Best of Josh Pyke & Rome
In May 2017, Pyke announced the release of his first greatest hits album, The Best of Josh Pyke, alongside new single "Into the Wind". The album was released on 30 June 2017.

In June 2019, Pyke published the children's book Lights Out, Leonard.

In March 2020, Pyke released "I Don't Know", the lead single from his sixth studio album, Rome, which was released on 28 August.

2021: To Find Happiness
On 5 November 2021, Pyke announced the release of his seventh studio album, To Find Happiness, released on 18 March 2022.

Ambassador and Partnerships

Indigenous Literacy Foundation (ILF) and Busking for Change
Pyke is an Indigenous Literacy Foundation (ILF) ambassador and has contributed thousands of dollars towards the fund. In September 2009, Pyke held the event 'Busking for Change' as part of Indigenous Literacy day, with all proceeds going towards the ILF. Pyke performed a solo set to a small audience, along with guest speakers from the ILF discussing the need for change in literacy levels in Indigenous communities. Pyke stated: "Indigenous issues are something I've been interested in for many years, and the concept of words and language and communicating ideas in that way is especially relevant to my own career". Following the success of the 2009 event, events were held annually and in 2012, Pyke confirmed he had raised over $50,000 in total for the ILF.

Josh Pyke Partnership
In conjunction with APRA in early 2013, Busking for Change presented the Josh Pyke Partnership. The partnership offered an unsigned musician the opportunity to receive mentorship and funding to help grow their career. Applicants submit a business plan explaining how they would like to grow their musical career. The prize included an initial meeting with Pyke, Gregg Donovan (Wonderlick Entertainment) and Stephen Wade (Select Music), a follow-up meeting and $7500 in funding. At the end of 2014, Josh announced the return of the Josh Pyke Partnership, which now runs annually.

Children's books
In 2019 Pyke released his first children's picture book, Lights Out Leonard (Penguin), with renowned illustrator Chris Nixon.
The book has gone on to be released in 6 foreign territories and translated into 5 languages.
Since then Pyke has released another 6 picture books: A Banana is A Banana (Josh Pyke, Justine Clarke, Heath Mckenzie, Penguin 2020), The Incredible Runaway Snot (Josh Pyke, Heath Mckenzie, Scholastic, 2020), Chatterpuss, (Josh Pyke, Daron Parton, Scholastic, 2021), Chatterpuss, In Deep Water, (Josh Pyke, Daron Parton, Scholastic, 2021), Family Tree, (Josh Pyke, Ronojoy Ghosh, Scholastic, 2022), The Bewilderbeast, (Josh Pyke, Binny Talib, Scholastic.) 
Notably, Family Tree was the ALIA National Simultaneous Story time book for 2022, seeing over 2.6 million people reading the book at the same time, and featuring Pyke and Ghosh appearing on a livestream from the National Library of Australia in the record breaking event.

Discography

Memories & Dust (2007)
Chimney's Afire (2008)
Only Sparrows (2011)
The Beginning and the End of Everything (2013)
But for All These Shrinking Hearts (2015)
Rome (2020)
To Find Happiness (2022)

Awards

APRA Awards
The APRA Awards are held in Australia and New Zealand by the Australasian Performing Right Association to recognise songwriting skills, sales and airplay performance by its members annually. Pyke has won one award from three nominations.

|-
| 2007
| "Middle of the Hill" 
| Most Performed Blues and Roots Work
| 
|-
| 2008
| "When We Get There" (with Michael Yezerski) 
| Best Original Song Composed for Screen
| 
|-
| 2012
| "Throw It Away" (360 featuring Josh Pyke)
| Urban Work of the Year
| 
|-
| 2022
| Troppo
| Best Television Theme
| 
|-

ARIA Music Awards
The ARIA Music Awards is an annual awards ceremony that recognises excellence, innovation, and achievement across all genres of Australian music. Pyke has won five awards from eighteen nominations.

|-
| 2006
| Feeding the Wolves
| Best Pop Release
| 
|-
| rowspan="5"| 2007 
| rowspan="3"| Memories & Dust
| Best Male Artist
| 
|-
| Best Adult Contemporary Album
| 
|-
| Breakthrough Artist – Album
| 
|-
| rowspan="2"| Wayne Connolly & Josh Pyke for Memories & Dust
| Producer of the Year
| 
|-
| Engineer of the Year
| 
|-
| rowspan="2"| 2009 
| rowspan="2"| Chimney's Afire
| Best Male Artist
| 
|-
| Best Adult Contemporary Album
| 
|-
| 2010 
| The Lighthouse
| Best Music DVD
| 
|-
| rowspan="3"| 2011 
| "No One Wants a Lover"
| Best Male Artist
| 
|-
| rowspan="2"| Wayne Connolly & Josh Pyke for "No One Wants a Lover"
| Producer of the Year
| 
|-
| Engineer of the Year
| 
|-
| rowspan="2"| 2012
| Only Sparrows
| Best Adult Contemporary Album
| 
|-
| Wayne Connolly & Josh Pyke for Only Sparrows
| Engineer of the Year
| 
|-
| 2013
| The Beginning and the End of Everything
| Best Adult Contemporary Album
| 
|-
| 2014 
| John Castle & Josh Pyke for The Beginning and the End of Everything
| Producer of the Year
| 
|-
| 2016 
| Live at the Sydney Opera House 
| Best Original Soundtrack/Cast/Show Album
| 
|-
| 2020
| Rome
| Best Adult Contemporary Album
| 
|-

Country Music Awards of Australia
The Country Music Awards of Australia (CMAA) (also known as the Golden Guitar Awards) is an annual awards night held in January during the Tamworth Country Music Festival, celebrating recording excellence in the Australian country music industry. They have been held annually since 1973.

|-
| 2017
| "F U Cancer" (with Catherine Britt)
| Vocal Collaboration of the Year
|

J Award
The J Awards are an annual series of Australian music awards that were established by the Australian Broadcasting Corporation's youth-focused radio station Triple J. They commenced in 2005.

|-
| J Awards of 2007
|Memories & Dust
| Australian Album of the Year
| 
|-
| J Awards of 2008
|"Make You Happy"
| Australian Video of the Year
|

References

External links

 

1983 births
21st-century Australian singers
ARIA Award winners
Australian alternative rock musicians
Australian indie pop musicians
Australian indie rock musicians
Australian singer-songwriters
Basement Birds members
Living people
Musicians from Sydney
Sony Music Australia artists